Carolina Herrera (born María Carolina Josefina Pacanins y Niño; 8 January 1939) is a Venezuelan fashion designer known for her personal style, and for dressing various First Ladies, including Jacqueline Onassis, Laura Bush, Michelle Obama, and Melania Trump.

Early life
María Carolina Josefina Pacanins y Niño was born  on 8 January 1939, in Caracas, Venezuela, to Guillermo Pacanins Acevedo, an air force officer and former governor of Caracas, and María Cristina Niño Passios. Her socialite grandmother introduced her to the world of fashion, taking young Carolina to shows by Balenciaga and buying her outfits at Lanvin and Dior. She has said, "My eye was accustomed to seeing pretty things."

Career and brand

In 1965, Herrera began her career working as a publicist for Emilio Pucci, a Florentine Marquis himself and a close family friend. She began working at Pucci's Caracas boutique, and moved to New York in 1980. Frequently associating with Mick and Bianca Jagger and Andy Warhol, at Studio 54, she became well known for her dramatic style. She first appeared on the International Best Dressed List in 1972, then was elected to its Hall of Fame in 1980. In 1981, her friend Diana Vreeland, then Editor-in-Chief of Vogue suggested that Carolina design a clothing line. She did so, having samples made in Caracas, and debuted her collection at Manhattan's Metropolitan Club to critical acclaim. A well known Park Avenue boutique, Martha's, agreed to showcase her clothing in their prominent windows. Upon this initial success, she returned to Caracas and raised capital to fund a more formal launch. Her first runway show in 1980 included future supermodel Iman. Carolina Herrera presents her Ready-to-Wear Collection semiannually at Mercedes-Benz Fashion Week in New York.

The company has been based in New York City since 1980, and in 1981 the brand received recognition from several key publications, including Women's Wear Daily and Tatler, with particular early attention to her well designed sleeves. A few of her most notable clients have included Jacqueline Kennedy Onassis, who asked her to design the dress for her daughter Caroline's wedding, Diana, Duchess of Cadaval, who asked her to design the dress for her marriage with Prince Charles-Philippe of Orléans, Duke of Anjou, and actress Renée Zellweger.

In the late 1980s, Spanish fragrance company Puig licensed the Carolina Herrera name to develop and market a line of perfumes. In 1995, the firm acquired the Carolina Herrera fashion business, retaining her as Creative Director. In 2008, they launched a ready-to-wear brand called CH Carolina Herrera; as of 2012, there were 18 Carolina Herrera and CH Carolina Herrera boutiques in the world, and her lines were carried in 280 stores in 104 countries. As of 2011, her daughters Carolina Jr. and Patricia Lansing participated in the creative direction and design. In February 2016, it was reported by WWD that the fragrance side of the business had more than 25,000 points of sale across the globe while the CH brand included 129 freestanding stores.

In 2015, the first advert for the brand was released, featuring models Elisabeth Erm and Joséphine Le Tutour.

In July 2016, Herrera announced the release of her new women's fragrance to be available for purchase in September, her biggest fragrance launch in 14 years. The scent is called 'Good Girl' and Karlie Kloss is the face of the fragrance.

In 2018, Herrera showed her last line for her eponymous brand and handed creative directorship of the brand over to Wes Gordon.

Awards and achievements
In 2008, Herrera was awarded the Geoffrey Beene Lifetime Achievement Award  from the Council of Fashion Designers of America, and "Womenswear Designer of the Year" in 2004. Herrera is a recipient of The International Center in New York's Award of Excellence as well as Spain's Gold Medal for Merit in the Fine Arts, which was presented to her in 2002 by King Juan Carlos I. She was awarded the Gold Medal of the Queen Sofía Spanish Institute in 1997.

She received the Fashion Group International Superstar Award, the Style Awards Designer of the Year in 2012 and the "Mercedes-Benz Presents" title for her 2011 collection. She has been on the cover of Vogue seven times.

Since 2004, she has been a member of the board of directors of jewelry designer Mimi So, and since 1999 on the board of the CFDA.

In 2005, she received the Golden Plate Award of the American Academy of Achievement during the International Achievement Summit in New York City.

In 2014, she earned the 2014 Couture Council Award for Artistry of Fashion.

Personal life
In 1957, at the age of 18, Herrera married Guillermo Behrens Tello, a Venezuelan landowner. Before their eventual divorce in 1964, they became the parents of two daughters:

 Mercedes Behrens-Pacanins
 Ana Luisa Behrens-Pacanins, who married developer Luis Paraud-Carpena, the son of Maj. Gen. Fernando Paraud of Madrid, in 1989.
In 1968, in Caracas, she married Reinaldo Herrera Guevara, who had inherited the Spanish title The 5th Marquis of Torre Casa in 1962 upon his father's death. Reinaldo was the host of Buenos Días, a Venezuelan morning-television news program and the elder son of Don Reinaldo Herrera Uslar, 4th Marquis of Torre Casa, a prominent Venezuelan sugarcane plantation owner, aristocrat and art collector. Therefore, by marriage, Carolina held the title The Marquise consort of Torre Casa, until it was retracted in 1992, as Reinaldo had issued no son. Her husband is a special-projects editor of Vanity Fair magazine. Together, they have two daughters, and six grandchildren, including:
 Carolina Adriana Herrera-Pacanins (b. 1969), who married Miguel Baez.
 Patricia Cristina Herrera-Pacanins, who married Gerrit Livingston Lansing Jr., a son of Suydam Rosengarten Lansing and Gerrit Livingston Lansing Sr. (a descendant of Robert Livingston), in 2002.
In 2009, Herrera became a naturalized United States citizen.

References

External links

 Carolina Herrera

1939 births
Living people
People from Caracas
High fashion brands
American fashion designers
American women fashion designers
American fashion businesspeople
Venezuelan women in business
Venezuelan emigrants to the United States
Venezuelan fashion designers
Venezuelan women fashion designers
Wedding dress designers
American women company founders
American company founders
Venezuelan company founders
People with acquired American citizenship
21st-century American women
Puig